Ilie Năstase and Ion Ţiriac were the defending champions but they withdrew from the tournament.

Arthur Ashe and Marty Riessen won in the final 6–8, 4–6, 6–3, 6–4, 11–9 against Tom Gorman and Stan Smith.

Seeds

Draw

Finals

Top half

Section 1

Section 2

Section 3

Section 4

Bottom half

Section 5

Section 6

Section 7

Section 8

References

External links
1971 French Open – Men's draws and results at the International Tennis Federation

Men's Doubles
French Open by year – Men's doubles